is a station on the Tokyo Kyuko Electric Railway Oimachi Line located in Setagaya, Tokyo, Japan.

Station layout
Two ground-level side platforms.

History
April 1, 1930 Opened.

Bus services
 bus stop
Tokyu Bus
<等01>Todoroki - Tamadzutsumi - Oyamadai Sta. - Todoroki (loop line)

Around The Station
Tokyo City University

References

Railway stations in Tokyo
Railway stations in Japan opened in 1930
Tokyu Oimachi Line
Stations of Tokyu Corporation